This is a list of gliders/sailplanes of the world, (this reference lists all gliders with references, where available) 
Note: Any aircraft can glide for a short time, but gliders are designed to glide for longer.

A

AAK (Akademski Aero Klub, Belgrade)
 AAK Pionir IIa

AAS
(Ateliers Aéronautiques de Suresnes)
 AAS Libération

AB Flygindustri 
 AB Flygindustri Fi-1
 AB Flygindustri Fi-3
 AB Flygindustri Lg 105
 AB Flygindustri G-101 (DFS Schulgleiter SG.38)
 AB Flygindustri Se-104
 AB Flygindustri C-180
 AB Flygindustri C-103

AB Flygplan 
 AB Flygplan Se-102
 AB Flygplan Se-103

Abate
( U. Abate)
 Abate GP-1

Abbott-Baynes Sailplanes Ltd
 Abbott Farnham sailplane
 Baynes Bat
 Abbott-Baynes Scud 1
 Abbott-Baynes Scud 2
 Abbott-Baynes Scud 3
 Carden-Baynes Auxiliary

Abramov 
 Abramov BA-3M Sokol
 Abramov VA-3/48 Cupidon 17m span
 Abramov VA-3/48 Dniepr 13.5m span

Abrial
(Georges Abrial de Pega)
 Levasseur-Abrial A-1
 Abrial A-2 Vautour
 Abrial A-3 Oricou
 Peyret-Abrial A-5 Rapace
 Abrial A-12 Bagoas
 Abrial A-13 Buse
 Abrial Air 5
 Abrial Air 50
 Abrial Air 6
 Abrial Air 65
 Abrial Air 60

Abric-Calas
(Abric & Calas)
 Abric-Calas 1909 glider

ACBA
(Aéro Club du Bas Armagnac)
 ACBA 3

AC Mulhouse Mure
(Aéro Club du Mulhouse)
 AC Mulhouse Mure

ACS
(Aero-Club Suisse)
 ACS Zögling

ACMN
(Aéro-Club des Montagnes Neuchâteloises)
 ACMN Caps I - Aéro-Club des Montagnes Neuchâteloises

Adair
(Ronald Hamilton Adair, Clifford Gurr and H. Zechner)
 Adair Altair

Adam
(Roger Adam)
 Adam RA-01
 Adam RA-02
 Adam RA-03
 Adam RA-08
 Adam RA-09
 Adam RA-10
 Adam RA-10S
 Adam RA-12
 Adam RA-13

Addyman 
(E.T.W. Addyman)
 Addyman STG
 Addyman Zephyr

ADI
(Aircraft Designs Inc / Martin Hollman / Winther-Hollman Aircraft Inc.)
 Hollman Condor)
 ADI Condor

Adaridi
(Boris Adaridi)
 Adaridi SK-24

Ader
(Clement Ader)
 Ader 1873 glider

Adorján
 Adorján Libelle

Advanced Aeromarine
 Advanced Aeromarine Sierra
 Advanced Aeromarine Sierra LS

Adventure Aircraft
 Adventure Aircraft EMG-6

AEA 
(Aerial Experimental Association)
 AEA 1907 glider

Aecherli-Farner
(Hermann Aecherli & Willy Farner)
 D.D. Zögling
 Aecherli Pfau 7
 Aecherli Pfau
 Aecherli HAFA-1
 Aecherli HAFA-2
 Aecherli HAFA-3
 Aecherli HAFA-4
 Aecherli HAFA-5
 Aecherli HAFA-6
 Aecherli HAFA-8
 Aecherli HAFA-9
 Aecherli Z-10

AER 
(Aeronautica Rio)
 AER M-100S Pegaso

AER Pegaso
 AER Pegaso M 100S

Aerbul
(Aerbul s.r.l. / Horacio Bulacio Campos)
 Aerbul HB-1 Club
 Aerbul HB-2	
 Aerbul HB-3	
 Aerbul HB-4
 Aerbul HB-5
 Aerbul HB-6

Aériane
Aériane Swift

Aero Industries Technical Institute
 Aero Industries Technical Institute G-2 
 Aero Industries Technical Institute TG-31

Aero Vodochody
 Aero A.17
 Aero VT 100 Démant
 Aero Ae-53

Aero-Club Suisse
 Ae.C.S. Zögling

AeroJaén
(Aeronaútica del Jaén SA)
 AeroJaén RF5-AJ1 Serrania
 AeroJaén AJ-1 Serrania

Aerola
(Also known as Aeros)
 Aerola AL-12
 Aerola AL-12M
 Aerola AC-21
 Aerola Alatus
 Aerola Alatus-M
 Aerola Alatus ME

Aeromere 
 Aeromere M-100S
 Aeromere M-100

Aeromot
 Aeromot AMT-100 Ximango
 Aeromot AMT-200 Super Ximango
 Aeromot AMT-300 Turbo Ximango Shark (motor glider)
 Aeromot AMT-600 Guri

Aeronca 
 Aeronca C.2 glider
 Aeronca TG-5

Aeros
see:Aerola

Aérostructure
(Aérostructure SARL)
 Aérostructure Lutin 80

Aerotalleres 
 Aerotaller E-38

Aerotechnik
(designer: Karel Dlouhy)
 Aerotechnik L-13 SDL Vivat
 Aerotechnik L-13 SL Vivat
 Aerotechnik L-13 SW Vivat
 Aerotechnik L-13 SE Vivat
 Aerotechnik L-13SDM Vivat
 Aerotechnik L-113

AeroXpert
(AeroXpert, Hennopsmeer / Peter Cellier & François Jordaan)
 AeroXpert AX-1

AGA
(AGA Aviation)
 AGA Aviation LRG – USN amphibious twin hull transport glider

Agusta
(Giovanni Agusta)
 Agusta glider

Ahrens
(Ahrens Aircraft Corporation)
 Ahrens AR 124

Aiello 
(Eugenio Aiello)
 Aiello 1
 Aiello 2

AII
(Aviation Industries of Iran)
 AII AVA-101

Aircraft Cooperative Mechta
 Fedorov Baïkal
 Aviastroitel AC-4 Russia
 Fedorov Istra
 Fedorov Mechta I

Air Energy
 Air Energy AE-1 Silent

Air Est Services 
 Air Est Goeland
 Air Est JCD 03 Pelican

Airdisco
(Aircraft Disposal Company)
 Airdisco Phi-Phi – Aircraft Disposal Company

Airmate
See: Schreder

Airspeed Ltd
 Airspeed Tern
 Airspeed AS.51 Horsa
 Airspeed AS.52
 Airspeed AS.53 Horsa
 Airspeed AS.58 Horsa II

AISA
(Émile Dewoitine / Aeronáutica Industrial S.A.)
 Iberavia IP-2
 Iberavia IE-02

Aizsardze
 Aizsardze

Akaflieg Berlin
(FFG Berlin / Akaflieg Berlin)
 Akaflieg Berlin B 1 "Charlotte"
 Akaflieg Berlin B 2 "Teufelchen"
 Akaflieg Berlin B 3 "Charlotte II"
 Akaflieg Berlin B 5
 Akaflieg Berlin B 6
 Akaflieg Berlin B 8
 Akaflieg Berlin B 11
 Akaflieg Berlin B 12
 Akaflieg Berlin B 13

Akaflieg Braunschweig
 Akaflieg Braunschweig SB-01 Storch
 Akaflieg Braunschweig SB-02 Brockenhexe
 Akaflieg Braunschweig SB-03
 Akaflieg Braunschweig SB-04
 Akaflieg Braunschweig SB-5 Danzig
 Akaflieg Braunschweig SB-6 Nixope
 Akaflieg Braunschweig SB-7 Nimbus
 Akaflieg Braunschweig SB-8
 Akaflieg Braunschweig SB-9 Stratus
 Akaflieg Braunschweig SB-10 Schirokko
 Akaflieg Braunschweig SB-11
 Akaflieg Braunschweig SB-12
 Akaflieg Braunschweig SB-13 Arcus
 Akaflieg Braunschweig SB-14
 Akaflieg Braunschweig SB-15

Akaflieg Danzig 
(Akademische Fliegergruppe T. H. Danzig)
 Akaflieg Danzig Boot-Danzig
 Akaflieg Danzig Libelle

Akaflieg Darmstadt
 Akaflieg Darmstadt D-1
 Akaflieg Darmstadt D-2 Pumpelmeise
 Akaflieg Darmstadt D-3 Nolleputzchen
 Akaflieg Darmstadt D-4 Edith
 Akaflieg Darmstadt D-5 Flohschwanz
 Akaflieg Darmstadt D-6 Geheimrat
 Akaflieg Darmstadt D-7 Margarete
 Akaflieg Darmstadt D-8 Karl der Große
 Akaflieg Darmstadt D-9 Konsul
 Akaflieg Darmstadt D-10 Hessen / Piepmatz
 Akaflieg Darmstadt D-11 Mohamed
 Akaflieg Darmstadt D-12 Römryke Berge
 Akaflieg Darmstadt D-13 Mohamed II
 Akaflieg Darmstadt D-15 Westpreußen
 Akaflieg Darmstadt D-17 Darmstadt and Chanute
 Akaflieg Darmstadt D-19 Darmstadt II
 Akaflieg Darmstadt D-20 Starkenburg
 Akaflieg Darmstadt D-28 Windspiel
 Akaflieg Darmstadt D-30 Cirrus
 Akaflieg Darmstadt D-31
 Akaflieg Darmstadt D-32
 Akaflieg Darmstadt D-33 (Lippisch / Heinemann DM-1)
 Akaflieg Darmstadt D-34
 Akaflieg Darmstadt D-36 Circe
 Akaflieg Darmstadt D-37 Artemis
 Akaflieg Darmstadt D-38
 Akaflieg Darmstadt D-39
 Akaflieg Darmstadt D-40
 Akaflieg Darmstadt D-41
 Akaflieg Darmstadt D-42
 Akaflieg Darmstadt D-43
 Akaflieg Darmstadt Schloss Mainberg
 FSV Darmstadt FSV 10

Akaflieg Darmstadt/Akaflieg München
 Akaflieg Darmstadt/Akaflieg München DM.1
 Akaflieg Darmstadt/Akaflieg München DM.2
 Akaflieg Darmstadt/Akaflieg München DM.3
 Akaflieg Darmstadt/Akaflieg München DM.4

Akaflieg Dresden 
 Akaflieg Dresden D-B1 Sehaufchen
 Akaflieg Dresden D-B2 Doris
 Akaflieg Dresden D-B3
 Akaflieg Dresden D-B4
 Akaflieg Dresden D-B5		
 Akaflieg Dresden D-B6	
 Akaflieg Dresden D-B7
 Akaflieg Dresden D-B8
 Akaflieg Dresden D-B9
 Akaflieg Dresden D-B10
 Akaflieg Dresden D-B11

Akaflieg Graz 
(Akademischen Segelfliegergruppe Graz)
 Graz G-20 Roland
 Graz G-23 Fliegendes Ei
 Graz G-25
 Graz G-26
 Graz G-27
 Graz G-28 Mücke
 Graz Graz
 Graz Graz II
 Graz Musger G-24
 Graz Oswald
 Graz Pagat
 Graz PN-1 Benjamin
 Graz Schöckelfalke
 Graz Sturmvogel
 Graz Vandale
 Graz VL-1 Maulwurf I
 Graz VL-1 Maulwurf II
 Graz VL-2 Kef
 Graz VL-3 Kauz
 Graz Zögling Hugin
 Graz Zögling Konrad
 Graz-Musger Mg-19S

Akaflieg Hannover
(for Hannoverische Waggonfabrik gliders see:Hannover)
 Akaflieg Hannover AFS 1 Schnecke
 Akaflieg Hannover AFH 2
 Akaflieg Hannover AFH 3
 Akaflieg Hannover AFH 4
 Akaflieg Hannover AFH 5
 Akaflieg Hannover AFH 6
 Akaflieg Hannover AFH 8
 Akaflieg Hannover AFH 10
 Akaflieg Hannover AFH 11
 Akaflieg Hannover AFH 17
 Akaflieg Hannover AFH 21 (Neukom Elfe S4d constructed by students)
 Akaflieg Hannover AFH-22
 Akaflieg Hannover AFH-24
 Akaflieg Hannover AFH 26
 Akaflieg Hannover Moritz
 Akaflieg Hannover Spatz – built by Hannoversche Waggonfabrik A.G., Hannover
 Akaflieg Hannover Strolch – Karl Bremer

Akaflieg Karlsruhe
 Akaflieg Karlsruhe HL-28 Bliemchen Brigant – built by SGK (Segelflieger Gruppe Karlsruhe)
 Akaflieg Karlsruhe AK-1 Mischl self-launching sailplane
 Akaflieg Karlsruhe AK-2
 Akaflieg Karlsruhe AK-5 Ardea
 Akaflieg Karlsruhe AK-5b Otto K.K.
 Akaflieg Karlsruhe AK-8
 Akaflieg Karlsruhe DG-1000J Turbine

Akaflieg Köln
 Akaflieg Köln AFK-1

Akaflieg Marcho-Silesia
 Schlesien in Not

Akaflieg München
 Akaflieg München Mü1 Vogel Roch
 Akaflieg München Mü2 Münchner Kindl
 Akaflieg München Mü3 Kakadu
 Akaflieg München Mü4 München
 Akaflieg München Mü5 Wastl
 Akaflieg München Mü6
 Akaflieg München Mü7
 Akaflieg München Mü10 Milan
 Akaflieg München Mü11 Papagei
 Akaflieg München Mü12 Kiwi
 Akaflieg München Mü13 Merlin / Atlante
 Akaflieg München Mü15
 Akaflieg München Mü16
 Akaflieg München Mü17 Merle
 Akaflieg München Mü18 Meßkrähe
 Akaflieg München Mü19
 Akaflieg München Mü20
 Akaflieg München Mü21
 Akaflieg München Mü22
 Akaflieg München Mü23 Saurier
 Akaflieg München Mü24
 Akaflieg München Mü25
 Akaflieg München Mü26
 Akaflieg München Mü27
 Akaflieg München Mü28
 Akaflieg München Mü31

Akaflieg Stuttgart
 Akaflieg Stuttgart F.1 Fledermaus
 Akaflieg Stuttgart fs16 Wipperstertz (Heide)
 Akaflieg Stuttgart fs17
 Akaflieg Stuttgart fs18a
 Akaflieg Stuttgart fs19
 Akaflieg Stuttgart fs20 [Project] Spring 1939, powered FS-17 devel.
 Akaflieg Stuttgart fs21 [Project] 1952 completion of revised FS-19
 Akaflieg Stuttgart fs22 [Project] 2-seat glider, trapezoidal wing, span 18 m
 Akaflieg Stuttgart fs23 Hidalgo
 Akaflieg Stuttgart fs24 Phönix
 Akaflieg Stuttgart fs25 Cuervo
 Akaflieg Stuttgart fs26 Moseppl
 Akaflieg Stuttgart fs29 TF
 Akaflieg Stuttgart fs31
 Akaflieg Stuttgart fs32 Aguila
 Akaflieg Stuttgart fs33 Gavilán
 Akaflieg Stuttgart fs34 Albatros
 Akaflieg Stuttgart fs35
 Akaflieg Stuttgart Icaré 1
 Akaflieg Stuttgart Icaré 2
 Akaflieg Stuttgart I (FVA 4)
 Akaflieg Stuttgart II (FVA Fox)
 Akaflieg Stuttgart LS 1 1926 'Roter Rand' = 'Red Edge', training glider, span 14 m'
 Akaflieg Stuttgart LS 2 1928 primary training glider, span 13 m, supervised by E Bachem & A Protzen

Akaflieg Wien 
 Akaflieg Wien AFW-8

Akasiya Mokko
 Shindo Cirrus 2

Akira 
(Myahara Akira)
 Akira 2C (日本式鳳2型)
 Akira Brume de chaleur (日本式かげろう型)

AK Zagreb
 AK Zagreb Borongaj

Akerboom-Schmidt
(J. Akerboom & J. Schmidt / Nijs & Van Driel)
 Akerboom-Schmidt T-10 I
 Akerboom-Schmidt T-10 II
 Akerboom-Schmidt T-10 III
 Akerboom-Schmidt T-10
 Akerboom-Schmidt T-20

Älands Flygklubb
 Älands Flygklubb glider

Alanne
(Pentti Alanne)
 Alanne Motorlerche

Albastar Ltd
Albastar A1
Albastar Apis
Albastar Sinus
Albastar Apis 15
Wezel Apis 2 Martin WEZEL

Albatros 
(Club Argentino de Planeadores Albatros / Alberto Rosmarin, Vito Antonio Ernesto Vignera & Jorge Ubaldo Pallich )
 Albatros 1
 Albatros 8-T-1 Jorge Newbery
 Giannoni Albatros 3-E-2
 Bertoni-Altinger BA-1 Superalbatros

Albatros Vrabac
 Albatros Vrabac A

Albini-Cella-Facciolo-Moltrasio
(Albini, Cella, Facciolo, Moltrasio)
 Albini-Cella-Facciolo-Moltrasio Zögling biposto

Aldasoro-Suárez
(Juan-Pablo Aldasoro-Suárez & Eduardo Aldasoro-Suárez - Real del Monte, Estado de Hidalgo, México)
 Aldasoro-Suárez 1909 glider

Alexander
(Albert W. Mooney / Alexander Aircraft Co, Colorado Springs (Colorado, USA)
 Alexander B-1

Alfaro (glider constructor)
 Alfaro ACA 1910

Alfieri
(A. Alfieri)
 Alfieri AT-1 Alcyone

Alise (glider constructor)
 Alise (glider)

Alisport 
(Alisport srl, Cremella, Italy)
 Alisport Silent
 Alisport Silent Club
 Alisport Silent 2
 Alisport Silent 2 Electro
 Alisport Silent 2 A302efi
 Alisport Silent 2 Targa
 Alisport Silent 2 Targa A302
 Alisport Silent Club A302efi
 Alisport Yuma

Allen 
(Aeronautical Engineering Society, New-York / E. Allen & E.P. Warner)
 Allen AES-1
 Allen AES-2

Allgeier
(Josef Allgeier)
 Allgaier Geier

Allied 
(Allied Aviation)
 Allied Aviation LRA
 Allied Aviation LR2A

Allievo 
 Allievo Milano
 Allievo Roma

Allstar 
(Allstar PZL Glider Sp. z o.o.)
 Allstar SZD-50-3 Puchacz
 Allstar SZD-51-1 Junior
 Allstar SZD-54 Perkoz
 Allstar SZD-59 Acro
 Allstar SZD-55-1

Alpaero 
 Alpaero Sirius

Alpla
(Alpla-Werke / Alpla-Werken Alvin Lehner OHG)
 Alpla AVo 60 Samburo
 Alpla AVo 68 Samburo a.k.a. M&D A Vo 68 Samburo

Alsema
(Piet Alsema)
 Alsema Sagitta

Altinger 
(Raúl Altinger & Theo Altinger)
 Altinger TA-1
 Altinger TA-2
 Altinger TA-3
 Altinger TA-4 Lenticular
 Altinger TA-5 Biguá
 Altinger TA-6
 Altinger TA-7 Yarará
 Altinger TA-8
 Altinger TA-12
 Altinger TA-15S Lenticular
 Altinger TA 24 Caracolero 
 Altinger-Bertoni Super Albatross

Anczutin-Malinowski-Aleksandrowicz
(AMA - Andrzej Anczutin, Henryk Malinowski & Rościsław Aleksandrowicz / Université Technique de Varsovie & Ateliers de Construction aéronautique d'Antoni Kocjan)
 AMA Motoszybowiec

AmEagle 
(AmEagle Corporation, aka* AmEagle American Eaglet)
 AmEagle Eaglet

American Falcon
 American Falcon (sailplane)

American Spirit (glider constructor)
 American Spirit XL

AMF
(AMF Microlight)
 AMF Chevvron 2-32C

AMS Flight
 Glaser-Dirks DG-303 Elan
 Glaser-Dirks DG-500
 Glaser-Dirks DG-505 Orion
 AMS Carat motorglider

Amstutz
(L. Lergier & Blaser / E. Amstutz, H. Belart & H. von Travel, Bern)
 Amstutz Thun

ANB
( Pytor Almurzin, Nikitin & Bogatov)
 ANB-M
 ANB-I

Andersson
(A.J. Andersson / Augsburger V.L.)
 Andersson Datschi

Andrews
(Kenneth Edwin Andrews)
 Andrews 1930 Glider

Andrews
(Kenneth Edwin Andrews)
 Andrews 1930 glider

ANEC
(W. S. SHACKLETON / Air Navigation and Engineering Company)
 ANEC 1

Anotchenko
(N.D. Anotchenko a.k.a. Anoschenko ND Macaque)
 Anotchenko Makaka

Ansaldo
(José María Ansaldo)
 Ansaldo Fabi

Antoni brothers Antoni
(Antoni brothers)
 Antoni Volumano

Antonov
(Oleg K. Antonov / Antonov Design Bureau(OKB))
 Antonov Standard-1 (Стандарт-1)
 Antonov Standard-2 (Стандарт-2)
 Antonov U-s1 (У-с1) – Uchebnyi (Учебный – "Trainer")
 Antonov U-s2 (У-с2) – first version built in series – Uchebnyi (Учебный – "Trainer")
 Antonov U-s3 (У-с3) – 1,600 built – Uchebnyi (Учебный – "Trainer")
 Antonov U-s4 (У-с4), redesignated A-1 – major production version – Uchebnyi (Учебный – "Trainer")(3000 built)
 Antonov U-s5 (У-с5)
 Antonov U-s6 (У-с6)
 Antonov P-s1 (П-с1) – Paritel'  (Паритель – "Sailplane")aka Upar (Упар, portmanteau of uchebnyi paritel'  – учебный паритель – "training sailplane")
 Antonov P-s2 (П-с2) – Paritel'  (Паритель – "Sailplane")aka Upar (Упар, portmanteau of uchebnyi paritel'  – учебный паритель – "training sailplane") – licence built as the THK-4 in Turkey
 Antonov B-s3 (Б-с3) – Buksirovochnye (Буксировочные – "Towed")
 Antonov B-s4 (Б-с4) – Buksirovochnye (Буксировочные – "Towed")
 Antonov B-s5 (Б-с5) – Buksirovochnye (Буксировочные – "Towed")
 Antonov RF-1 Rot Front
 Antonov RF-2 Rot Front
 Antonov RF-3 Rot Front
 Antonov RF-4 Rot Front
 Antonov RF-5 Rot Front
 Antonov RF-6 Rot Front
 Antonov RF-7 Rot Front (red front)
 Antonov RF-8 Rot Front
 Antonov A-1
 Antonov A-2
 Antonov A-3 Molodv
 Antonov A-7 aka RF-8
 Antonov A-9
 Antonov A-10 version of A-9
 Antonov A-11
 Antonov A-13
 Antonov A-15
 Antonov A-40 a.k.a. KT – Krylya Tanka – Flying Tank
 Antonov E-153
 Antonov M-1
 Antonov M-3
 Antonov M-4
 Antonov M-5
 Antonov OKA-1 Golub ("Dove")
 Antonov OKA-2
 Antonov OKA-3
 Antonov OKA-5 Standard-2
 Antonov OKA-6 Gorod Lenina (City of Lenin)
 Antonov OKA-7 Bubik
 Antonov OKA-11 (PS-1 training glider)
 Antonov OKA-12 (PS-2 training glider)
 Antonov OKA-13 Chest Uslovii Stalina ("Stalin's six conditions")
 Antonov OKA-14 DIP ("Dognat i peregnat") ("Catch up and overtake")
 Antonov OKA-17 (RF-1 experimental glider) (1933)
 Antonov OKA-18 (RF-2 experimental glider) (1933)
 Antonov OKA-19 (RF-3 experimental glider) (1933)
 Antonov OKA-20 (RF-4 experimental glider) (1933)
 Antonov OKA-21 (apparently based on OKA-14) (1933)
 Antonov OKA-23  RF-5 experimental glider (1934)
 Antonov OKA-24  M-3 experimental glider (1934)
 Antonov OKA-28  RF-6 experimental glider
 Antonov OKA-29  M-4 experimental glider
 Antonov OKA-30  M-5 experimental glider (1936)
 Antonov OKA-31  BS-5 training glider (1936)
 Antonov OKA-32  US-5 training glider (1936)
 Antonov OKA-33 (LEM-2 motor glider)
 Antonov Amur
 Antonov DIP
 Antonov IP experimental glider
 Antonov Golub
 Antonov Staline 1
 Antonov Staline 5
 Antonov E153 Masha

Antykacap
 Antykacap

Apogs
 Apogs

Applebay Sailplanes
 Applebay GA-II Chiricahua
 Applebay GA-111 Mescalero
 Applebay Zia
 Applebay Zuni

Ara
(Agence Rethéloise d'Aviation)
 Ara 1930 primary

Archdeacon 
(Ernest Archdeacon)
 Archdeacon 1904 glider (1)
 Archdeacon 1904 glider (2)
 Archdeacon 1905 glider
 Archdeacon-Voisin 1905 glider

Armstrong-Whitworth
 Armstrong-Whitworth A.W.52G

ARMV-2 
(Atelierele de Reparatii Material Volant-2 – Pipera)
 ARMV-2 CT-2 – Traian Costǎchescu
 ARMV-2 OP-2 – Ovidiu Popa
 ARMV-2 GP-2 – Octavian Giuncu & Ovidiu Popa

Armytage
(Norman Armytage)
 Armytage 1929 glider

Arplam
(All Reinforced Plastic Mouldings / Leuvense university Aero Club)
 Arplam Leuvense L-1

Arsenal 
(Arsenal de l'Aéronautique)
 Air 100
 Air 101
 Air 102
 Arsenal 4111
 Arsenal 1301
 Arsenal 2301
 Arsenal Guerchais-Roche SA-103 Emouchet
 Arsenal S.A.104 Emouchet
 Arsenal S.A 104 Emouchet Escopette
 Arsenal SA.110 Eider

Arup
(Arup Inc (fdr: Cloyd L Snyder), 231 Lincoln Way, South Bend IN.)
 Arup S-1

Arzeulov 
(K.K. Arzeulov)
 Arzeulov A-1
 Arzeulov A-2
 Arzeulov A-3
 Arzeulov A-5

ASC
(Advanced Soaring Concepts / Jensen Tor)
 ASC Falcon
 ASC Spirit
 ASC Test
 ASC Apex

Ashfield
(R. J. Ashfield)
 Ashfield Kl Biplane

ASUP
(Ugo Abate & Giovanni Pirelli / ASUP / Fratelli Visco, Somma Lombardo)
 ASUP 1924 glider
 ASUP GP-1

Ateliers Vosgiens
 Ateliers Vosgiens 1909 glider

Aubiet
(Marceau Aubiet)
 Aubiet 1922 glider

Auburn
(Robert J. Auburn)
 Auburn Sun Spot

August
(Henry August)
 August 1909 glider

Aurora
(Aurora Training Sailplane Project)
 Aurora TBD

Auseklis
 Auseklis (glider)

AVF 
(Akademiya Vozdushnogo Flota - Air Fleet Academy)
 AVF-01 Aral
 AVF-03 Mastyazhart
 AVF-04 Rabfakovets – АВФ-4 Рабфаковец
 AVF-05 Mastyazhart-2 – АВФ-5 Мастяжарт-2
 AVF-06				
 AVF-07 Strekoea-pechatnitsa – АВФ-7 Стрекоэа-печатница
 AVF-08 Condor – АВФ-8 Кондор
 Denisov AVF-09 Krasvoenlet
 AVF-10 – АВФ-10
 AVF-11 Komsomolets – АВФ-11 Комсомолец	
 AVF-12 KIM – АВФ-12 КИМ
 AVF-13 Bis – АВФ-13 бис
 AVF-13 Larionich – АВФ-13 Ларионыч
 AVF-14	1924	URSS		Planeur
 AVF-16 Aeo – АВФ-16 ЭАП
 AVF-17 Une Nuit – АВФ-17 Одна ночъ
 AVF-18 Pionnier – АВФ-18 Пионер
 AVF-19 – Бураго АВФ-19
 AVF-21 Moskau
 AVF-23 Krasnaia Presnia
 AVF-34

Avia
 Avia LM-02

AVIA
(Ateliers vosgiens d'industrie aéronautique)
 AVIA X-A
 AVIA XI-A
 AVIA XV-A
 AVIA XX-A
 AVIA 11A (XIA ?)
 AVIA 15A (XVA ?)
 AVIA 22A
 AVIA 30E
 AVIA 32E
 AVIA 40P
 AVIA 41P
 AVIA 50MP
 AVIA 60MP
 AVIA 151A
 AVIA 152A

A.V.I.A.
(Azionaria Vercellese Industrie Aeronautiche – Francis Lombardi)
 AVIA FL.3
 AVIA LM.02

Aviad
(Aviad Francesco Di Martino)
 Aviad Zigolo MG12

Aviafiber 
see:Farner

Avialsa
 Avialsa 60 Fauconnet

Aviamilano 
(Aviamilano Costruzione Aeronautiche)
 Aviamilano A2 Standard
 Aviamilano A3
 Aviamilano CPV1

Aviastroitel
 Aviastroitel AC-4 Russia Россия АС-4
 Aviastroitel AC-4M
 Aviastroitel AC-5K
 Aviastroitel AC-5M
 Aviastroitel AC-5MP
 Aviastroitel AC-6
 Aviastroitel AC-7
 Aviastroitel AC-7K
 Aviastroitel AC-7M
 Aviastroitel AC-8

Aviatrust
 Aviatrust Moskau
 Aviatrust Rote Presnia

Notes

Further reading

External links

Lists of glider aircraft